Euglandina mazatlanica is a species of predatory air-breathing land snail, a terrestrial pulmonate gastropod mollusk in the family Spiraxidae.

Subspecies 
 Euglandina mazatlanica abbreviata (Von Martens, 1891)''

References

Spiraxidae
Gastropods described in 1891